George Guy (1 November 1896 – 1975) was an English footballer who played as a centre forward for Bolton Wanderers and Rochdale. He was joint top goal scorer for Rochdale (with William Sandham) in 1922–23.

References

Rochdale A.F.C. players
Bolton Wanderers F.C. players
Grimsby Town F.C. players
Aberdare Town F.C. players
Chorley F.C. players
English footballers
1896 births
1975 deaths
Footballers from Bolton
Association footballers not categorized by position